The 2016 VTV9 - Binh Dien International Women's Volleyball Cup was the 10th staging. The tournament was held in Ninh Bình, Vietnam.

Pools composition
Live on VTV9, VTV6, THE THAO TV and SKTV16

Pool standing procedure
 Number of matches won
 Match points
 Sets ratio
 Points ratio
 Result of the last match between the tied teams

Match won 3–0 or 3–1: 3 match points for the winner, 0 match points for the loser
Match won 3–2: 2 match points for the winner, 1 match point for the loser

Preliminary round
All times are Vietnam Standard Time (UTC+07:00).

Pool A

        

|}

|}

Pool B

        

|}

|}

Classification 5th-8th
All times are Vietnam Standard Time (UTC+07:00).

Classification 5th-8th

|}

7th place

|}

5th place

|}

Final round
All times are Vietnam Standard Time (UTC+07:00).

Semifinals

|}

3rd place match

|}

Final

|}

Final standing

Awards

Most Valuable Player
 Yang Wenjin (Jiangsu)
Best Setter
  Rong Wanqianbai (Jiangsu)
Best Outside Hitters
 Tran Thi Thanh Thuy (VTV Bình Điền Long An)
 Dinh Thi Thuy (Vietinbank)

Best Middle Blockers
 Wu Han (Jiangsu)
 Nguyen Thi Ngoc Hoa (VTV Bình Điền Long An)
Best Opposite Spiker
Au Hong Nhung (Thông tin LVPB )
Best Libero
 Bui Vu Thanh Tuyen (Vietinbank)
Miss cup
 Wang Yuqi (Jiangsu)

VTV9 – Binh Dien International Women's Volleyball Cup
Voll
2016 in women's volleyball